Franz Schubert's compositions of 1826 are mostly in the Deutsch catalogue (D) range D 863–895, and include:
 Instrumental works:
 String Quartet No. 15, D 887
 Rondo in B minor for violin and piano, D 895
 Piano Sonata in G major, D 894
 Vocal music:
 Deutsche Messe, D 872
 "Im Frühling", D 882
 "Ständchen", D 889
 "An Sylvia", D 891

Table

Legend

List

|-
| 863
| 863
| data-sort-value="ZZZZ" |
| data-sort-value="ZZZZ" |
| data-sort-value="413,00" | IV, 13
| An Gott
| data-sort-value="text Kein Auge hat dein Angesicht geschaut" | Kein Auge hat dein Angesicht geschaut
| data-sort-value="1827-01-01" | 1827 orearlier
| Text by Hohlfeld (setting by Rindler publ. 1826); Music lost
|-
| 864
| 864
| data-sort-value="ZZZZ" |
| data-sort-value="ZZZZ" |
| data-sort-value="413,00" | IV, 13
| data-sort-value="Totenhemdchen, Das" | Das Totenhemdchen
| data-sort-value="text Starb das Kindlein" | Starb das Kindlein
| data-sort-value="1825-01-01" | 1825 orlater
| data-sort-value="Text by Bauernfeld, Eduard von, Starb das Kindlein" | Text by Bauernfeld; Music lost
|-
| 865
| 865
| data-sort-value="105,1828-1" | 105,1(1828)
| data-sort-value="1600,012" | XVINo. 12
| data-sort-value="303,34" | III, 3 No. 34IV, 5
| Widerspruch
| data-sort-value="text Wenn ich durch Busch und Zweig" | Wenn ich durch Busch und Zweig
| data-sort-value="1826-01-01" | 1826?–1828?
| data-sort-value="Text by Seidl, Johann Gabriel, Wenn ich durch Busch und Zweig" | Text by Seidl; Two versions: 1st for ttbb and piano
|-
| 866
| 866
| data-sort-value="095,1828-0" | 95(1828)
| data-sort-value="2008,508" | XX, 8Nos.508–511
| data-sort-value="405,00" | IV, 5
| data-sort-value="Refrainlieder, 4" | Vier Refrainlieder: 1. Die Unterscheidung – 2. Bei dir allein – 3. Die Männer sind méchant – 4. Irdisches Glück
| data-sort-value="text Die Mutter hat mich jungst gescholten" | 1. Die Mutter hat mich jüngst gescholten – 2. Bei dir allein empfind ich, daß ich lebe – 3. Du sagtest mir es, Mutter – 4. So mancher sieht mit finstrer Miene
| data-sort-value="1828-06-21" | Summer1828?
| data-sort-value="Text by Seidl, Johann Gabriel, Die Mutter hat mich jungst gescholten" | Text by Seidl
|-
| 867
| 867
| data-sort-value="105,1828-2" | 105,2(1828)
| data-sort-value="2008,512" | XX, 8No. 512
| data-sort-value="405,00" | IV, 5
| Wiegenlied, D 867
| data-sort-value="text Wie sich der Auglein kindlicher Himmel" | Wie sich der Äuglein kindlicher Himmel
| data-sort-value="1826-01-01" | 1826?–1828?
| data-sort-value="Text by Seidl, Johann Gabriel, Wie sich der Auglein kindlicher Himmel" | Text by Seidl
|-
| 869
| 869
| data-sort-value="XXX,1832" | (1832)
| data-sort-value="2008,496" | XX, 8No. 496
| data-sort-value="414,00" | IV, 14
| data-sort-value="Totengraber-Weise" | Totengräber-Weise
| data-sort-value="text Nicht so duster und so bleich" | Nicht so düster und so bleich
| data-sort-value="1826-01-01" | 1826
| data-sort-value="Text by Schlechta, Franz Xaver von, Nicht so duster und so bleich"| Text by 
|-
| 870
| 870
| data-sort-value="080,1827-1" | 80,1(1827)
| data-sort-value="2008,506" | XX, 8No. 506
| data-sort-value="404,00" | IV, 4
| data-sort-value="Wanderer an den Mond, Der" | Der Wanderer an den Mond
| data-sort-value="text Ich auf der Erd', am Himmel du" | Ich auf der Erd', am Himmel du
| data-sort-value="1826-01-01" | 1826
| data-sort-value="Text by Seidl, Johann Gabriel, Ich auf der Erd', am Himmel du" | Text by Seidl
|-
| 871
| 871
| data-sort-value="080,1827-2" | 80,2(1827)(1979)
| data-sort-value="2008,507" | XX, 8No. 507
| data-sort-value="404,00" | IV, 4
| data-sort-value="Zugenglocklein, Das" | Das Zügenglöcklein
| data-sort-value="text Kling die Nacht durch, klinge" | Kling die Nacht durch, klinge
| data-sort-value="1826-01-01" | 1826
| data-sort-value="Text by Seidl, Johann Gabriel, Kling die Nacht durch, klinge" | Text by Seidl; Two versions: 2nd, in AGA, is Op. 80 No. 2
|-
| 872
| 872
| data-sort-value="XXX,1854" | (1854)(1870)
| data-sort-value="1302,007" | XIII, 2No. 7
| data-sort-value="106,00" | I, 6
| Deutsche Messe mit dem Anhang "Das Gebet des Herrn" (German Mass with The Lord's Prayer appended): 1. Zum Eingang – 2. Zum Gloria – 3. Zum Evangelium und Credo – 4. Zum Offertorium – 5. Zum Sanctus – 6. Nach der Wandlung – 7. Zum Agnus Dei – 8. Schlussgesang – Anh.: Das Gebet des Herrn
| data-sort-value="text Wohin soll ich mich wenden" | 1. Wohin soll ich mich wenden – 2. Ehre, Ehre sei Gott in der Höhe! – 3. Noch lag die Schöpfung formlos da – 4. Du gabst, o Herr, mir Sein und Leben – 5. Heilig, heilig, heilig, heilig ist der Herr! – 6. Betrachtend deine Huld und Güte – 7. Mein Heiland, Herr und Meister! – 8. Herr, du hast mein Flehn vernommen – Anh.: Anbetend deine Macht und Größe
| data-sort-value="1827-06-21" | summer orearly fall1827
| data-sort-value="Text by Neumann, Johann Philipp Deutsche Messe" | Text by Neumann; Two versions: 1st for SATB and organ – 2nd, in AGA, adds winds, and optional double bass; Ferd. Schubert started publishing his arrangements from before 1838; Vocal score publ. in 1854
|-
| 873
| 873
| data-sort-value="XXX,1974" | (1974)
| data-sort-value="ZZZZ" |
| data-sort-value="304,72" | III, 4 Anh. II No. 2VIII, 2 No. 29
| Canon, D 873
| data-sort-value="key A major" | A major
| data-sort-value="1826-01-01" | January1826?
| For six voices; Sketch
|-
| data-sort-value="999.08731" |
| data-sort-value="873.1" | 873A
| data-sort-value="ZZZZ" |
| data-sort-value="ZZZZ" |
| data-sort-value="304,73" | III, 4Anh. II No. 3
| data-sort-value="Nachklange" | Nachklänge
| data-sort-value="ZZZZ" |
| data-sort-value="1826-01-01" | January1826?
| For ttbb; Sketch
|-
| 874
| 874
| data-sort-value="ZZZZ" |
| data-sort-value="ZZZZ" |
| data-sort-value="414,00" | IV, 14
| data-sort-value="O Quell, was stromst du rasch und wild" | O Quell, was strömst du rasch und wild
| data-sort-value="text O Quell, was stromst du rasch und wild" | O Quell, was strömst du rasch und wild
| data-sort-value="1826-01-01" | January1826?
| data-sort-value="Text by Schulze, Ernst, O Quell, was stromst du rasch und wild" | Text by Schulze; Sketch
|-
| 875
| 875
| data-sort-value="102,1831-0" | 102(1831)
| data-sort-value="1600,027" | XVINo. 27
| data-sort-value="303,35" | III, 3 No. 35
| Mondenschein
| data-sort-value="text Des Mondes Zauberblume lacht" | Des Mondes Zauberblume lacht
| data-sort-value="1826-01-01" | January1826
| data-sort-value="Text by Schober, Franz von, Des Mondes Zauberblume lacht" | Text by Schober; For ttbbb and piano (only voices in AGA, piano score in 1st ed. not original)
|-
| data-sort-value="999.08751" |
| data-sort-value="875.1" | 875A
| data-sort-value="ZZZZ" |
| data-sort-value="ZZZZ" |
| data-sort-value="302,98" | III, 2bAnh. No. 8
| data-sort-value="Allmacht, Die, D 875A" | Die Allmacht, D 875A
| data-sort-value="text Gross ist Jehova, der Herr! 2" | Groß ist Jehova, der Herr!
| data-sort-value="1826-01-01" | January1826
| data-sort-value="Text by Pyrker, Ladislaus, Gross ist Jehova, der Herr! 2"| Text by Pyrker; For SATB and piano; Sketch
|-
| 876
| 876
| data-sort-value="XXX,1838" | (1838)
| data-sort-value="2008,487" | XX, 8No. 487
| data-sort-value="414,00" | IV, 14
| data-sort-value="Im Janner 1817" | Im Jänner 1817 a.k.a. Tiefes Leid
| data-sort-value="text Ich bin von aller Ruh' geschieden" | Ich bin von aller Ruh' geschieden
| data-sort-value="1826-01-01" | January1826
| data-sort-value="Text by Schulze, Ernst, Ich bin von aller Ruh' geschieden" | Text by Schulze
|-
| 877
| 877
| data-sort-value="062,1827-0" | 62(1827)
| data-sort-value="2008,488" | XX, 8Nos.488–491
| data-sort-value="302,23" | III, 2b No. 23IV, 3
| data-sort-value="Gesange aus Wilhelm Meister" | Gesänge aus Wilhelm Meister (Songs from Wilhelm Meister): 1. Mignon und der Harfner – 2.–4. Lied der Mignon
| data-sort-value="text Nur wer die Sehnsucht kennt 5" | 1.&4. Nur wer die Sehnsucht kennt – 2. Heiß mich nicht reden, heiß mich schweigen – 3. So laßt mich scheinen, bis ich werde
| data-sort-value="1826-01-01" | January1826
| data-sort-value="Text by Goethe, Johann Wolfgang von from Wilhelm Meister's Apprenticeship, Nur wer die Sehnsucht kennt 5" | Text by Goethe, from Wilhelm Meister's Apprenticeship (other settings: , 359,  469, 481, 656, 726 and 727); No. 1 for two voices and piano; No. 2 has two versions; No. 4 reuses music of 
|-
| 878
| 878
| data-sort-value="105,1828-3" | 105,3(1828)
| data-sort-value="2008,492" | XX, 8No. 492
| data-sort-value="405,00" | IV, 5
| Am Fenster
| data-sort-value="text Ihr lieben Mauern hold und traut" | Ihr lieben Mauern hold und traut
| data-sort-value="1826-03-01" | March 1826
| data-sort-value="Text by Seidl, Johann Gabriel, Ihr lieben Mauern hold und traut" | Text by Seidl
|-
| 879
| 879
| data-sort-value="105,1828-4" | 105,4(1828)
| data-sort-value="2008,493" | XX, 8No. 493
| data-sort-value="405,00" | IV, 5
| data-sort-value="Sehnsucht, D 879" | Sehnsucht, D 879
| data-sort-value="text Die Scheibe friert, der Wind ist rauh" | Die Scheibe friert, der Wind ist rauh
| data-sort-value="1826-03-01" | March 1826
| data-sort-value="Text by Seidl, Johann Gabriel, Die Scheibe friert, der Wind ist rauh" | Text by Seidl
|-
| 880
| 880
| data-sort-value="080,1827-3" | 80,3(1827)
| data-sort-value="2008,494" | XX, 8No. 494
| data-sort-value="404,00" | IV, 4
| Im Freien
| data-sort-value="text Draussen in der weiten Nacht" | Draußen in der weiten Nacht
| data-sort-value="1826-03-01" | March 1826
| data-sort-value="Text by Seidl, Johann Gabriel, Draussen in der weiten Nacht" | Text by Seidl
|-
| 881
| 881
| data-sort-value="096,1828-4" | 96,4(1828)(1895)
| data-sort-value="2008,495" | XX, 8No. 495
| data-sort-value="405,00" | IV, 5
| Fischerweise
| data-sort-value="text Den Fischer fechten Sorgen und Gram und Leid nicht an" | Den Fischer fechten Sorgen und Gram und Leid nicht an
| data-sort-value="1826-03-01" | March 1826
|-
| 882
| 882
| data-sort-value="101,1828-1" | 101p,1(1828)
| data-sort-value="2008,497" | XX, 8No. 497
| data-sort-value="405,00" | IV, 5
| data-sort-value="Im Fruhling" | Im Frühling
| data-sort-value="text Still sitz' ich an des Hugels Hang" | Still sitz' ich an des Hügels Hang
| data-sort-value="1826-03-01" | March 1826
| data-sort-value="Text by Schulze, Ernst, Still sitz' ich an des Hugels Hang" | Text by Schulze
|-
| 883
| 883
| data-sort-value="XXX,1832" | (1832)
| data-sort-value="2008,498" | XX, 8No. 498
| data-sort-value="414,00" | IV, 14
| Lebensmut, D 883
| data-sort-value="text O wie dringt das junge Leben" | O wie dringt das junge Leben
| data-sort-value="1826-03-01" | March 1826
| data-sort-value="Text by Schulze, Ernst, O wie dringt das junge Leben" | Text by Schulze
|-
| 884
| 884
| data-sort-value="108,1829-1" | 108,1(1829)
| data-sort-value="2008,500" | XX, 8No. 500
| data-sort-value="405,00" | IV, 5
| data-sort-value="Uber Wildemann" | Über Wildemann
| data-sort-value="text Die Winde sausen am Tannenhang" | Die Winde sausen am Tannenhang
| data-sort-value="1826-03-01" | March 1826
| data-sort-value="Text by Schulze, Ernst, Die Winde sausen am Tannenhang" | Text by Schulze
|-
| 885
| 885
| data-sort-value="066,1826-0" | 66(1826)
| data-sort-value="0901,005" | IX, 1No. 5
| data-sort-value="714,05" | VII/1, 4
| data-sort-value="Grande Marche Heroique" | Grande Marche Héroique
| data-sort-value="key A minor" | A minor
| data-sort-value="1826-09-03" | 
| For piano duet
|-
| 887
| 887
| data-sort-value="161,1851-0" | 161p(1851)
| data-sort-value="0500,015" | V No. 15
| data-sort-value="605,16" | VI, 5No. 16
| data-sort-value="String Quartet, D 887" | String Quartet No. 15
| data-sort-value="key G major" | G major
| data-sort-value="1826-06-30" | 20–30/6/1826
| Allegro molto moderato – Andante un poco mosso  – Scherzo – Allegro assai
|-
| 888
| 888
| data-sort-value="XXX,1850" | (1850)
| data-sort-value="2008,502" | XX, 8No. 502
| data-sort-value="414,00" | IV, 14
| data-sort-value="Trinklied, D 888" | Trinklied, D 888
| data-sort-value="text Bacchus, feister Furst des Weins" | Bacchus, feister Fürst des Weins
| data-sort-value="1826-07-01" | July 1826
|-
| 889
| 889
| data-sort-value="XXX,1830" | (1830)
| data-sort-value="2008,503" | XX, 8No. 503
| data-sort-value="414,00" | IV, 14
| data-sort-value="Standchen, D 889" | Ständchen, D 889
| data-sort-value="text Horch, horch! die Lerch im Atherblau" | Horch, horch! die Lerch im Ätherblau
| data-sort-value="1826-07-01" | July 1826
| data-sort-value="Text by Shakespeare, William from Cymbeline II, 03, transl. by Mayerhofer von Grunbuhel and Bauernfeld" | Text by Shakespeare from Cymbeline II, 3, transl. by Schlegel, A. W.
|-
| 890
| 890
| data-sort-value="XXX,1830" | (1830)
| data-sort-value="2008,504" | XX, 8No. 504
| data-sort-value="414,00" | IV, 14
| Hippolits Lied
| data-sort-value="text Lasst mich, ob ich auch still vergluh" | Laßt mich, ob ich auch still verglüh
| data-sort-value="1826-07-01" | July 1826
| data-sort-value="Text by Gerstenberg, Georg Friedrich von, Lasst mich, ob ich auch still vergluh" | Text by 
|-
| 891
| 891
| data-sort-value="106,1828-4" | 106,4(1828)
| data-sort-value="2008,505" | XX, 8No. 505
| data-sort-value="405,00" | IV, 5
| An Sylvia a.k.a. An Silvia a.k.a. Gesang, D 891
| data-sort-value="text Was ist Silvia, saget an" | Was ist Silvia, saget an
| data-sort-value="1826-07-01" | July 1826
| data-sort-value="Text by Shakespeare, William from The Two Gentlemen of Verona IV, 02, transl. by Bauernfeld" | Text by Shakespeare from The Two Gentlemen of Verona IV, 2, transl. by Bauernfeld
|-
| 892
| 892
| data-sort-value="134,1839-0" | 134p(1839)
| data-sort-value="1600,013" | XVINo. 13
| data-sort-value="303,36" | III, 3 No. 36
| Nachthelle
| data-sort-value="text Die Nacht ist heiter" | Die Nacht ist heiter
| data-sort-value="1826-07-01" | September1826
| data-sort-value="Text by Seidl, Johann Gabriel, Die Nacht ist heiter" | Text by Seidl; For tenor solo, ttbb and piano
|-
| 893
| 893
| data-sort-value="XXX,1827" | (1827)
| data-sort-value="1600,041" | XVINo. 41
| data-sort-value="304,57" | III, 4No. 57
| Grab und Mond
| data-sort-value="text Silberblauer Mondenschein fallt herab" | Silberblauer Mondenschein fällt herab
| data-sort-value="1826-07-01" | September1826
| data-sort-value="Text by Seidl, Johann Gabriel, Silberblauer Mondenschein fallt herab" | Text by Seidl; For ttbb
|-
| 894
| 894
| data-sort-value="078,1827-0" | 78(1827)
| data-sort-value="1000,012" | X No. 12
| data-sort-value="723,16" | VII/2, 3No. 16
| Piano Sonata, D 894 ("Fantasie")
| data-sort-value="key G major" | G major
| data-sort-value="1826-10-01" | October1826
| Molto moderato e cantabile – Andante – Minuet – Allegretto
|-
| 895
| 895
| data-sort-value="070,1827-0" | 70(1827)
| data-sort-value="0800,001" | VIIINo. 1
| data-sort-value="608,07" | VI, 8 No. 7
| Rondo, D 895, a.k.a. Rondeau brillant
| data-sort-value="key B minor" | B minor
| data-sort-value="1826-10-01" | October1826
| For violin and piano
|}

Lists of compositions by Franz Schubert
Compositions by Franz Schubert
Schubert